William Robert Hay (27 June 1934 – 29 April 2018) was an Australian rules footballer who played with Hawthorn in the Victorian Football League (VFL).

He was the older brother of fellow Hawthorn players Phil Hay and Sted Hay.

Notes

External links 

1934 births
Australian rules footballers from Victoria (Australia)
Hawthorn Football Club players
2018 deaths